The 1990 Tour de France was the 77th edition of Tour de France, one of cycling's Grand Tours. The Tour began in Futuroscope with a prologue individual time trial on 30 June and Stage 10 occurred on 10 July with a mountain stage to Saint-Gervais. The race finished on the Champs-Élysées in Paris on 22 July.

Stage 11
11 July 1990 — Saint-Gervais to Alpe d'Huez,

Stage 12
12 July 1990 — Fontaine to Villard-de-Lans,  (individual time trial)

Stage 13
14 July 1990 — Villard-de-Lans to Saint-Étienne,

Stage 14 
15 July 1990 — Le Puy-en-Velay to Millau,

Stage 15 
16 July 1990 — Millau to Revel,

Stage 16 
17 July 1990 — Blagnac to Luz Ardiden,

Stage 17
18 July 1990 — Lourdes to Pau,

Stage 18
19 July 1990 — Pau to Bordeaux,

Stage 19
20 July 1990 — Castillon-la-Bataille to Limoges,

Stage 20
21 July 1990 — Lac de Vassivière to Lac de Vassivière,  (individual time trial)

Stage 21
22 July 1990 — Brétigny-sur-Orge to Paris Champs-Élysées,

References

1990 Tour de France
Tour de France stages